The Little Heroes Foundation, previously the McGuinness McDermott Foundation, was launched in May 1996 in memory of five-year-old Nicholas Berry, and seven-year-old Nathan Maclean who died of cancer.  The Foundation raises funds to improve oncology treatment for South Australian children.  The Foundation was established by former Adelaide Football Club players Tony McGuinness and Chris McDermott.

Projects 
Oncology treatment for children in South Australia is chiefly undertaken at the Women's and Children's Hospital, North Adelaide. The majority of the Foundation's activities aim to support the hospital in its treatment of cancer.

The Foundation has undertaken or provided support to a number of projects including:
 Extensions to the Ronald McDonald Children's Clinic
 Establishment of the Brookman Cancer Ward
 Extensions to the Dialysis Unit
 Improvements to the Adolescent Ward
 Purchase of an x-ray machine and refurbishment of the Medical Imaging rooms
 Upgrading of the holding bay in Paediatric Theatres
 Upgrading the Endocrinology and Diabetes Centre
 The purchase of a HPLC machine for the Gastroenterology Unit
 The purchase of the MRI scanner
 Endoscopic Theatre Suite Redevelopment

Fundraising activities 

The Foundation raises funds through a variety of means ranging from direct donations, sale of specialised merchandise, to special events - often with a sporting theme.

The most widely publicised event is the "Slow Down".   Slow Down is an annual Australian rules football match held at the end of the regular season, with teams drawn mostly from ex-AFL and SANFL players.  The players competing are loosely aligned to the two Adelaide-based AFL sides: Adelaide Crows and Port Adelaide Power.  The name "Slow Down" is a play on words to the local football derby between Adelaide and Port Adelaide, which is promoted as a "Showdown". For a gold coin entrance fee spectators enjoy a lighthearted game where entertainment is more the aim than the actual outcome on the scoreboard.  Attendance in 2005 was over 30,000.

Other fund-raising activities include charity golf events, special event Luncheons, and sales from specialist items such as modified versions of the popular board games, Monopoly and Trivial Pursuit.

Controversy
Financial reports for the McGuinness McDermott Foundation in 2007-08, obtained by The Advertiser from the Office of Consumer and Business Affairs, shows that part of the funds raised for the McGuinness McDermott Foundation were being used to lease a BMW X5 and Mercedes CLK 280.

References

External links
 Little Heroes Foundation Website
 Women's and Children's Hospital

Children's charities based in Australia
Foundations based in Australia
Health charities in Australia
Organisations based in Adelaide
Medical and health organisations based in South Australia